Peanut soup or groundnut soup is a soup made from peanuts, often with various other ingredients. It is a staple African cuisine but is also eaten in East Asia (Taiwan), the United States (mainly in Virginia) and other areas around the world. It is also common in some regions, such as Argentina northwest, Bolivia and Peru, where it can sometimes be served with bone meat and hollow short pasta or fries. In Ghana it is often eaten with fufu or omo tuo and is often very spicy. Groundnut soup is also a native soup of the Benin (Edo) people in Nigeria and it is often eaten with pounded yam.  Some of the essential ingredients used in making it are Piper guineense (uziza seed) and Vernonia amygdalina (bitter leaf).

It is prepared from groundnut which is mashed into a paste, usually termed as groundnut paste. Groundnut soup is eaten with eba, fufu, banku, kenkey and so on. It is a delicacy that Nigerian, Ghanaian and people in other African countries consume, such as in Sierra Leone. In Ghana, it is known as nkatenkwan in Akan language.

Gallery

See also 

 Peanut stew
 Palm nut soup
 List of peanut dishes
 List of soups

References

External links 
 Ghanaian groundnut soup – recipe
 Nigerian groundnut soup - recipe 

African soups
Argentine cuisine
Bolivian soups
Ghanaian cuisine
National dishes
Nigerian soups
Peanut dishes
Peruvian soups
Sierra Leonean cuisine
Taiwanese soups
Virginia cuisine
West African cuisine